Erateina zoraida is a species of moth in the family Geometridae first described by Edward Doubleday in 1845. It is the type species of the genus Erateina, by original designation.

Description
This moth has elongated, caudate (tapering to a long, tail-like extension at the apex) hindwings.

Distribution and habitat
These day-flying moths are typically montane and can be found in Neotropical cloud forests of Venezuela.

Bibliography
;  &  (2013). "A new Andean element in the lepidopterous fauna of the Guiana Shield: the day-flying genus Erateina Doubleday, with the description of two new species from Roraima, Tramen and Auyán Tepui (Geometridae: Larentiinae)". Genus. 24 (3-4): 291-301.

References

 Catalogue of Life
 
 

Moths described in 1845
Larentiinae
Geometridae of South America
Moths of South America
Fauna of the Tepuis